Josef Svoboda (born 9 October 1930) is a Czech gymnast. He competed in eight events at the 1952 Summer Olympics.

References

External links
  

1930 births
Possibly living people
Czech male artistic gymnasts
Olympic gymnasts of Czechoslovakia
Gymnasts at the 1952 Summer Olympics
Place of birth missing (living people)